Milford Township is a township in Barton County, Missouri, USA.  As of the 2000 census, its population was 290.

Geography
The township contains one incorporated settlement, Milford, from which it takes its name. According to the USGS, it contains two cemeteries: Howell and Round Prairie.

The streams of Hyder Branch, Lacey Branch, Patton Branch, Ring Branch and White Oak Branch run through this township.

References

 USGS Geographic Names Information System (GNIS)

External links
 US-Counties.com
 City-Data.com

Townships in Barton County, Missouri
Townships in Missouri